Catherine Virginia Turner (born February 14, 2000) is an American singer-songwriter. She rose to prominence as a contestant on season 16 of American Idol, placing in the top seven. On September 24, 2019, Turner further gained notoriety after her song "Prom Queen" was used in the trailer for Shane Dawson's web series The Beautiful World of Jeffree Star, which gained over 11 million views in just one week. She has released two EPs: The Sad Vegan as an independent artist and Heartbroken and Milking It with Atlantic Records.

Career

2017–2018: American Idol 
Turner had previously auditioned for several reality singing shows, beginning at 11 years old with America's Got Talent. She then auditioned for The Voice twice and auditioned unsuccessfully for the fifteenth season of American Idol. After trying again in 2017, she received a golden ticket to Hollywood. In an audition held in New York, she sang her original song "21st Century Machine." Her segment on American Idol was the first shown during the sixteenth season's premiere on March 11, 2018. 

After getting through Hollywood Week, she made it to the Showcase Round where she sang "Bad Romance" by Lady Gaga. In the Top 24, she sang "Call Me" by Blondie and "Good to Be Alive (Hallelujah)" with Andy Grammer. After advancing to the Top 14, she sang "Take Me to Church" by Hozier and immediately advanced to the next round. In the Top 10, she sang "Once Upon a Dream" from the movie Sleeping Beauty. 

She advanced to the Top 7, where she was one of two contestants to be eliminated from American Idol. After singing "Oops!... I Did It Again" by Britney Spears, Turner forgot some of the words to "Manic Monday" by The Bangles, a flub noticed by the judges. After her elimination, Turner commented that if she had been voted into the next episode, she would have given up her spot to another contestant. Clay Aiken, who finished second place on the second season of American Idol, called the show a "Vacation Bible School talent show" for the judges' response to the blunder. 

During the finale of season 16, she reprised her original "21st Century Machine" and sang "Part of Me" as a duet with Katy Perry. Turner was among the performers starring in American Idol Live! 2018, a 47-city tour that ran from July 11 through September 16, 2018.

Performance results 
{|class="wikitable" style="text-align: center;"
|-
! Episode
! Theme
! Song Choice
! Original Artist
! Order Number
! Result
|-
| Audition
| Auditioner’s Choice
| "21st Century Machine"
| Herself
| N/A
| Advanced
|-
| Hollywood Round, Part 1
| Contestant's Choice
| "Come Together"
| The Beatles
| N/A
| Advanced
|-
| Hollywood Round, Part 2
| Group Performance
| "La La La" (with Alyssa Raghu, Kyah Robinson and Victoria McQueen)
| Naughty Boy
| N/A
| Advanced
|-
| Hollywood Round, Part 3
| Contestant’s Choice
| "Pity"
| Herself
| N/A
| Advanced
|-
| Showcase Round/Top 50
| Contestant’s Choice
| "Bad Romance"
| Lady Gaga
| 10
| Advanced
|-
| rowspan="2"|Top 24 Solo/Duet
| rowspan="2"|Contestant’s Choice
| Solo  "Call Me"
| Blondie
| 3
| rowspan="2"|Advanced
|-
| Duet  "Good to Be Alive (Hallelujah)" (with Andy Grammer)
| Andy Grammer
| 1
|-
| rowspan="2"|Top 14
| Contestant’s Choice
| "Take Me to Church"
| Hozier
| 7
| rowspan="2"|Safe
|-
| Victory Song
| "Havana"
| Camila Cabello
| 13
|-
| Top 10
| Disney
| "Once Upon a Dream" (from Sleeping Beauty)
| Jack Lawrence & Sammy Fain
| 9
| Safe
|-
| rowspan="2"|Top 7
| Year of Birth
| "Oops!... I Did It Again"
| Britney Spears
| 5
| rowspan="2"|Eliminated
|-
| Prince
| "Manic Monday"
| The Bangles
| 12
|}

 2019: The Sad Vegan 
She performed in Los Angeles in 2018 with Haley Reinhart at the Troubadour and performed solo at the El Rey Theatre and Hotel Cafe. In the spring of 2019, she performed as an opening act for singer Justin Jesso in Los Angeles, New York and Toronto, followed by an opening spot for Meghan Trainor in Atlantic City. 

On March 1, 2019, Turner released "Prom Queen". Raisa Bruner of Time described the song as displaying "aching, existential honesty", with Turner's voice suggesting "wisdom beyond her years". Madeline Crone of American Songwriter described it as an "anxiety-ridden underdog anthem". On June 7, 2019, she released "Savior," her lead single for her debut EP, The Sad Vegan, which released June 14. In the summer of 2019, she headlined The Sad Vegan Tour.

On May 17, 2019, Turner, partnering with Postmodern Jukebox, made a vintage strings cover of Billie Eilish's song "idontwannabeyouanymore." The cover has over 1.4million views on YouTube as of December 2021.

On September 24, 2019, her live and acoustic version of "Prom Queen" was used in its entirety as the trailer for Shane Dawson's 2019 YouTube series The Beautiful World of Jeffree Star. The trailer was #1 trending on YouTube, receiving more than 11 million views in one week. The series has also featured several songs from her EP, The Sad Vegan, including "Breathe," "Home," and "Party!"

 2020–present: Record deal, Heartbroken and Milking It 
On April 29, 2020, Turner signed to Atlantic Records over a Zoom call. In November of that year, she made her Atlantic Records debut by releasing the single "One Day". 

On July 16, 2021, Turner released her second EP, Heartbroken and Milking It, with six songs written during the COVID-19 pandemic. In an interview with American Songwriter'', Turner explained the title: "When you have nothing to write about during a pandemic, what can you do? You can milk from past heartbreak." The EP included two previous singles: "Play God" and "Therapy". 

Another single, "(Wish I Didn't Have to) Lie" featuring the pop artist Jordy, was distributed after the EP's release. The song brought the pair on the cover of Spotify's "Sad Hour" playlist. Turner would later sing "(Wish I Didn't Have to) Lie" for Jordy's Mind Games Tour in December 2021. She was also, along with pop artist Oston, an opening act on the tour.

Turner released the song "God Must Hate Me" on November 23, 2021, after a demo that she teased on her TikTok account went viral.

"Fat Funny Friend," composed by Turner with American Idol season 16 contestant Maddie Zahm, became Zahm's breakthrough single after her recording of the song was released on February 4, 2022.

Personal life 
In 2018, Turner graduated from Neshaminy High School in Langhorne, Pennsylvania.

Discography

Extended plays

Singles

References

External links 
 Official website
 Hashtag Catie on YouTube
 hashtagcatie on TikTok

2000 births
21st-century American singers
21st-century American women singers
American Idol participants
Atlantic Records artists
Living people
People from Bucks County, Pennsylvania
Singer-songwriters from Pennsylvania